Yellowstone National Park, located primarily in the U.S. state of Wyoming, though the park also extends into Montana and Idaho and its Mountains and Mountain Ranges are part of the Rocky Mountains. Two of the ranges—The Washburn Range and the Red Mountains—are minor and completely enclosed within park boundaries. The other two ranges are major, multi-state ranges that extend far beyond the boundaries of the park. The highest peak in the park, Eagle Peak is in the Absaroka Range.

Absaroka Range
 Eagle Peak - el. ; 
 Mount Schurz - el. ; 
 Abiathar Peak - el. ; 
 Atkins Peak - el. ; 
 Pollux Peak - el. ; 
 Grant Peak - el. ; 
 Turret Mountain - el. ; 
 Castor Peak - el. ; 
 Cutoff Mountain - el. ; 
 Colter Peak - el. ; 
 Mount Langford - el. ; 
 The Trident - el. ; 
 Reservation Peak - el. ; 
 Silvertip Peak - el. ; 
 Hoodoo Peak - el. ; 
 First Peoples Mountain - el. ; 
 Cathedral Peak - el. ; 
 The Thunderer - el. ; 
 Meridan Peak - el. ; 
 Avalanche Peak (Wyoming) - el. ; 
 Republic Peak - el. ; 
 Saddle Mountain - el. ; 
 Arthur Peak - el. ; 
 Barronette Peak - el. ; 
 Hoyt Peak - el. ; 
 Hague Mountain - el. ; 
 Amphitheater Mountain - el. ; 
 Mount Stevenson - el.  ; 
 Cody Peak - el. ; 
 Parker Peak - el. ; 
 Mount Chittenden - el. ; 
 Top Notch Peak - el. ; 
 Mount Hornaday - el. ; 
 Grizzly Peak - el. ; 
 The Needle - el. ; 
 Mount Norris - el. ; 
 Cache Mountain - el. ; 
 Druid Peak - el. ; 
 Frederick Peak - el. ; 
 Bison Peak - el. ;

Gallatin Range

 Electric Peak - el. ; 
 Joseph Peak - el. ; 
 Mount Holmes - el. ; 
 Gray Peak - el. ; 
 Bannock Peak - el. ; 
 Antler Peak - el. ; 
 Trilobite Point - el. ; 
 Quadrant Mountain - el. ; 
 Dome Mountain - el. ; 
 Three Rivers Peak - el. ; 
 Sepulcher Mountain - el. ; 
 Echo Peak - el. ; 
 White Peaks - el. ; 
 Meldrum Mountain - el. ; 
 Bunsen Peak - el. ; 
 Purple Mountain - el. ; 
 Mount Jackson - el. ; 
 Mount Haynes - el. ;
 Clagett Butte - el. ; 
 Terrace Mountain - el.  
 Three Brothers Mountains - el.  
 Mount Everts - el. ;

Washburn Range
 Mount Washburn - el. ; 
 Dunraven Peak - el. ; 
 Cook Peak - el. ; 
 Hedges Peak - el. ; 
 Amethyst Mountain - el. ; 
 Prospect Peak - el. ; 
 Observation Peak - el. ; 
 Folsom Peak - el. ; 
 Specimen Ridge - el. ;

Red Mountains
 Mount Sheridan- el. ; 
 Factory Hill - el. ;

Isolated summits
 Mount Hancock - el. ; 
 Barlow Peak - el. ; 
 Channel Mountain - el. ; 
 Elephant Back Mountain - el. ; 
 Trischman Knob - el. ; 
 Douglas Knob - el. ; 
 Horseshoe Hill - el. ; 
 Roaring Mountain - el ;

See also
 Plateaus of Yellowstone National Park
 List of mountain ranges in Wyoming

Notes

Lists of mountains of the United States
Lists of mountain ranges of the United States